John Clerk (fl. 1419–1421) was an English Member of Parliament. He may also have been an attorney or yeoman.

As John Clerk was such a common name, it is unclear which of the local John Clerks sat in Parliament in these years.

He was a Member (MP) of the Parliament of England for Shaftesbury in 1419 and May 1421.

References

15th-century deaths
English MPs 1419
People from Shaftesbury
English MPs May 1421
14th-century births